A subclinical infection—sometimes called a preinfection or inapparent infection—is an infection by a pathogen that causes few or no signs or symptoms of infection in the host. Subclinical infections can occur in both humans and animals. Depending on the pathogen, which can be a virus or intestinal parasite, the host may be infectious and able to transmit the pathogen without ever developing symptoms; such a host is called an asymptomatic carrier. Many pathogens, including HIV, typhoid fever, and coronaviruses such as COVID-19 spread in their host populations through subclinical infection.

Not all hosts of asymptomatic subclinical infections will become asymptomatic carriers. For example, hosts of Mycobacterium tuberculosis bacteria will only develop active tuberculosis in approximately one-tenth of cases; the majority of those infected by Mtb bacteria have latent tuberculosis, a non-infectious type of tuberculosis that does not produce symptoms in individuals with sufficient immune responses. 

Because subclinical infections often occur without eventual overt sign, in some cases their presence is only identified by microbiological culture or DNA techniques such as polymerase chain reaction (PCR) tests.

Transmission

In humans 
Many pathogens are transmitted through their host populations by hosts with few or no symptoms, including sexually transmitted infections such as syphilis and genital warts. In other cases, a host may develop more symptoms as the infection progresses beyond its incubation period. These hosts create a natural reservoir of individuals that can transmit a pathogen to other individuals. Because cases often do not come to clinical attention, health statistics frequently are unable to measure the true prevalence of an infection in a population. This prevents accurate modeling of its transmissability.

In animals 
Some animal pathogens are also transmitted through subclinical infections. The A(H5) and A(H7) strains of avian influenza are divided into two categories: low pathogenicity avian influenza (LPAI) viruses, and highly pathogenic avian influenza (HPAI) viruses. While HPAI viruses have a very high mortality rate for chickens, LPAI viruses are very mild and produce few, if any symptoms; outbreaks in a flock may go undetected without ongoing testing. 

Wild ducks and other waterfowl are asymptomatic carriers of avian influenza, notably HPAI, and can be infected without showing signs of illness. The prevalence of subclinical HPAI infection in waterfowl has contributed to the international outbreak of highly lethal H5N8 virus that began in early 2020.

Pathogens known to cause subclinical infection

The following pathogens (together with their symptomatic illnesses) are known to be carried asymptomatically, often in a large percentage of the potential host population:

 Baylisascaris procyonis
 Bordetella pertussis (Pertussis or whooping cough)
 Chlamydia pneumoniae
 Chlamydia trachomatis (Chlamydia)
 Clostridium difficile
 Cyclospora cayetanensis
 Dengue virus
 Dientamoeba fragilis
 Entamoeba histolytica
 Enterotoxigenic Escherichia coli
 Epstein–Barr virus
 Group A streptococcal infection
 Helicobacter pylori
 Herpes simplex (oral herpes, genital herpes, etc.)
 HIV-1 (HIV/AIDS)
 Influenza (strains)
 Legionella pneumophila (Legionnaires' disease)
 Measles viruses
 Mycobacterium leprae (leprosy)
 Mycobacterium tuberculosis (tuberculosis)
 Neisseria gonorrhoeae (gonorrhoea)
 Neisseria meningitidis (Meningitis)
 Nontyphoidal Salmonella
 Noroviruses
 Poliovirus (Poliomyelitis)
 Plasmodium (Malaria)
 Rabies lyssavirus (Rabies)
 Rhinoviruses (Common cold)
 Salmonella enterica serovar Typhi (Typhoid fever)
 SARS-CoV-2 (COVID-19) and other coronaviruses
 Staphylococcus aureus
 Streptococcus pneumoniae (Bacterial pneumonia)
 Treponema pallidum (syphilis)

See also

References

Further reading
 

Human diseases and disorders
Epidemiology
Infectious diseases
Medical terminology
Symptoms